Bosnia and Herzegovina participated in the Eurovision Song Contest 2002 with the song "Na jastuku za dvoje" written by Dragan Mijatović and Ružica Čavić. The song was performed by Maja Tatić. The Bosnian broadcaster Public Broadcasting Service of Bosnia and Herzegovina (PBSBiH) organised the national final BH Eurosong 2002 in order to select the Bosnian entry for 2002 contest in Tallinn, Estonia. Sixteen entries participated during the show on 23 February 2002 where the winner was determined over two rounds of voting. The top four entries in the first round selected by an eight-member jury advanced to the second round, during which "Na jastuku za dvoje" performed by Maja Tatić was selected as the winner.

Bosnia and Herzegovina competed in the Eurovision Song Contest which took place on 25 May 2002. Performing during the show in position 15, Bosnia and Herzegovina placed thirteenth out of the 24 participating countries, scoring 33 points.

Background

The nation's best placing in the contest was seventh, which it achieved in 1999 with the song "Putnici" performed by Dino and Béatrice. The Bosnian national broadcaster, Public Broadcasting Service of Bosnia and Herzegovina (PBSBiH), broadcasts the event within Bosnia and Herzegovina and organises the selection process for the nation's entry.

Before Eurovision

BH Eurosong 2002 
The seventh edition of BH Eurosong, BH Eurosong 2002, was held on 23 February 2002 at the FTV studios in Sarajevo and hosted by Segmedina Srna and Mladen Vuković. The show was broadcast on BHTV1 as well as streamed online via the broadcaster's website pbsbih.ba.

Competing entries
115 valid submissions out of 170 were received during a submission period where artists and composers to submit their entries, and the broadcaster announced the sixteen entries selected to compete in the national final on 11 January 2002. Among the selected songwriters included 1999 Bosnian Eurovision entrant Dino Dervišhalidović. The eight-member selection committee that determined the competing entries from the received submissions consisted of Milorad Kenjalović (Dean of Academy of Arts at the University of Banja Luka), Dragan Džidić (director of Melodije Mostara), Elmir Rekić (director of Festival Bihać), Ismeta Dervoz (FTV Eurovision Song Contest 2002 executive producer), Miroslav Maraus (Bosnian Head of Delegation at the Eurovision Song Contest), Sinan Alimanović (music director of PBSBiH), Vasilije Pokrajčić (music director of RTRS) and Luka Sekara (professor).

Final
The final was held on 23 February 2002 at the FTV studios in Sarajevo. Sixteen entries participated and two rounds of jury voting selected the winner. In the first round, the top four entries were selected by an eight-member jury to proceed to the second round, the superfinal. In the superfinal, an alternate three-member jury selected "Na jastuku za dvoje" performed by Maja Tatić as the winner. The eight-member jury panel that voted during the first round consisted of Nino Pršeš (2001 Bosnian Eurovision entrant), Vesna Smiljanić (music professor), Blaž Slišković (football manager), Dragan Kostić (director of the Banja Luka Clinical Center), Mladen Vojičić Tifa (singer), Mediha Musliović (actress), Vehid Šehić (President of the Forum of Tuzla Citizens) and Vesna Andree-Zaimović (musicologist), while the three-member jury panel that voted during the second round consisted of Miroslav Maraus (Bosnian Head of Delegation at the Eurovision Song Contest), Amila Bakšić (opera director of the Sarajevo National Theatre) and Vasilije Pokrajčić (music director of RTRS).

At Eurovision
According to Eurovision rules, all nations with the exceptions of the bottom six countries in the 2001 contest competed in the final. On 9 November 2001, a special allocation draw was held which determined the running order and Bosnia and Herzegovina was set to perform in position 15, following the entry from the Denmark and before the entry from Belgium. Bosnia and Herzegovina finished in thirteenth place with 33 points.

The show was broadcast in Bosnia and Herzegovina on BHTV1 with commentary by Ismeta Dervoz-Krvavac. The Bosnian spokesperson, who announced the Bosnian votes during the show, was Segmedina Srna.

Voting 
Below is a breakdown of points awarded to Bosnia and Herzegovina and awarded by Bosnia and Herzegovina in the contest. The nation awarded its 12 points to Sweden in the contest.

References

2002
Countries in the Eurovision Song Contest 2002
Eurovision